A union school district is a type of school district in some U.S. states. 

Union School District may also refer to:

 Union Elementary School District, Tolleson, Arizona
 Union School District, San Jose, California
 Union School District (Connecticut), Union, Connecticut
 Union Community School District, La Porte City, Iowa
 Union Public School District (Mississippi), Union, Mississippi
 Union Public School District, Union Township, Union County, New Jersey
 Union Public Schools, Tulsa, Oklahoma
 Union School District (Pennsylvania), Clarion County, Pennsylvania
 Union School District (Arkansas), a former school district in Union County, Arkansas

See also 
 Union School (disambiguation)
 Union City School District (disambiguation)
 Union Free School District